Ian Patricio Mac-Niven Carlsson (born 25 October 1971) is a Chilean former professional footballer who played as an attacking midfielder.

Career
A product of Universidad Católica youth system, Mac-Niven made his debut thanks to the coach Vicente Cantatore in 1991 and stayed with them until 1996, with stints on loan at Deportes Concepción (1993) and Deportes Antofagasta (1994). In 1997, he joined Colombian side Deportes Tolima, but he didn't make any appearance.

At youth international level, he represented Chile at under-20 level in the 1991 South American Championship and at under-23 level in the 1992 Pre-Olympic Tournament.

At senior international level, he represented Chile in two friendlies in 1995.

After football
Mac-Niven graduated as a journalist and got a degree in sport management at the European University of Madrid.

He worked for the Football Federation of Chile as head of logistics of the Chile senior team from 2017 to 2021.

Honours
Universidad Católica
 Copa Chile: 1991, 1995

References

External links
 
 Ian Mac-Nive at National-Football-Teams.com
 

1971 births
Living people
Footballers from Santiago
Chilean footballers
Chilean expatriate footballers
Chile under-20 international footballers
Chile international footballers
Club Deportivo Universidad Católica footballers
Deportes Concepción (Chile) footballers
C.D. Antofagasta footballers
Deportes Tolima footballers
Chilean Primera División players
Categoría Primera A players
Association football midfielders
Chilean expatriate sportspeople in Colombia
Expatriate footballers in Colombia
Chilean journalists
Chilean sports journalists